Joshua S. Holliday (born September 14, 1976) is an American college baseball coach and former professional player in Minor League Baseball.  Currently the head coach of the Oklahoma State Cowboys baseball team, he was hired to this position prior to the 2013 season.  In 2014, Holliday was the Big 12 Conference Baseball Coach of the Year as OSU claimed the conference regular season championship.

Before becoming head coach of the Cowboys, Holliday played college baseball for OSU while attending as a student. He was drafted by the Toronto Blue Jays in 1999, for whom he played two seasons in the minor leagues.  He then returned to his alma mater as an assistant coach and subsequently coached as an assistant for NC State, Georgia Tech, Arizona State and Vanderbilt.

College playing career
The Minnesota Twins drafted Holliday in the 14th round after high school in 1995, but he did not sign.  He instead attended Oklahoma State University (OSU) and played college baseball there for the Cowboys.  He earned four varsity letters at OSU while playing in 256 games, second all-time with the Cowboys.  He ranks highly in many statistical categories among Cowboy greats, placing seventh in home runs (HR) with 53, first in walks (BB) with 225, and in the top five in runs, hits, doubles, total bases, runs batted in (RBI), and hit by pitches.

Minor league career (1999–2000)
After his college career, Holliday was drafted for a second time.  The Toronto Blue Jays selected him in the ninth round of the 1999 amateur draft. He played for two seasons in Minor League Baseball in the Toronto organization.  A versatile player, he frequently played first base and catcher, and also appeared at third base, right field and left field.

In 1999 with the Class A short-season St. Catharines Stompers, Holliday produced a .902 on-base plus slugging (OPS) in 71 games.  He batted .255, but managed to score 50 runs due in part to drawing 63 walks for a .439 on-base percentage.  He also hit 13 doubles and 10 home runs for a .463 slugging percentage.  The next season with the Class A Hagerstown Suns, his batting average slipped to .220 in 74 games, but his 52 BB placed his OBP at .381 and he scored 46 runs.  His OBP in those two season was .410 in spite of a combined .237 batting average.

Coaching career (2001–present)
Prior to the 2001 season, Holliday returned to Stillwater to become a student assistant coach under his father, head coach Tom Holliday.  He became a full-time staff member the following season and served for two years.  Holliday spent the 2004 season at NC State, who made an NCAA Tournament appearance.  Following his single season in Raleigh, Holliday was hired as an assistant at ACC rival Georgia Tech, who reached the 2006 College World Series, won the 2005 ACC Tournament, and were among the nation's elite in several offensive categories.  Holliday was named to the staff of Arizona State beginning in 2008.  During his tenure, the Sun Devils signed the nation's top recruiting class and appeared in the 2009 College World Series.  For his efforts, Vanderbilt named him recruiting coordinator and assistant coach in 2010.  The Commodores made a run to the College World Series with Holliday on the staff. It was the program's first College World Series appearance. As recruiting coordinator at Vanderbilt, Holliday helped assemble a roster that would set a SEC record for regular season conference wins with a 26–3 record in 2013, his first year as head coach in Stillwater.

On June 8, 2012, Holliday was named head coach of the Oklahoma State Cowboys, returning to his childhood home to lead the program for which he played.  He is the first head coach at OSU who also played for the Cowboys.

Head coaching record
Below is a table of Holliday's yearly records as an NCAA head baseball coach.

Personal life
Holliday's father was an assistant coach at Oklahoma State while Josh grew up and while he played at Oklahoma State, and the elder Holliday later served as head coach while Josh was an assistant. Holliday's brother, Matt Holliday is a retired Major League Baseball outfielder/designated hitter and All-Star and has previously played for the New York Yankees, St. Louis Cardinals, the Colorado Rockies, and the Oakland Athletics. In July 2019, Matt joined his brother's coaching staff as OSU's volunteer assistant. Holliday is married with two children.

See also
List of current NCAA Division I baseball coaches

References

External links

Living people
Oklahoma State Cowboys baseball players
St. Catharines Stompers players
Hagerstown Suns players
Oklahoma State Cowboys baseball coaches
NC State Wolfpack baseball coaches
Georgia Tech Yellow Jackets baseball coaches
Arizona State Sun Devils baseball coaches
Vanderbilt Commodores baseball coaches
1976 births
Baseball coaches from Arizona
Baseball coaches from Oklahoma